Isabella of Castile (1283–1328) was the Queen of Aragon as the first wife of King James II and Duchess of Brittany as the second wife of Duke John III.

Isabella was born in Toro, the eldest daughter of King Sancho IV of Castile and María de Molina. As On 1 December 1291, Isabella married King James II of Aragon in the city of Soria. The bride was only eight years old and the groom twenty-four. The marriage was never consummated.

Sancho IV died on 25 April 1295. James chose to change his alliances and take advantage of the turmoil inside Castile. He had their wedding annulled and proceeded to marry Blanche of Anjou.

Isabella remained unwed for about a decade. In 1310, at Burgos, she married her second husband, Duke John III of Brittany. There were no children from this marriage. She was buried at Prières Abbey.

References

Sources

External links

|-

|-

|-

1283 births
1328 deaths
People from the Province of Zamora
Castilian infantas
Isabella
Aragonese queen consorts
Majorcan queens consort
Countesses of Barcelona
Royal consorts of Sicily
Duchesses of Brittany
13th-century people from the Kingdom of Aragon
14th-century Breton women
Remarried royal consorts
Daughters of kings